Sam Roberts (born October 2, 1974) is a Canadian rock singer-songwriter who has released seven 
albums. His debut EP The Inhuman Condition, reached the Canadian charts in 2002. He and his bandmates have released three albums as Sam Roberts and four albums as Sam Roberts Band. He is also a member of Canadian supergroup Anyway Gang, who released their debut self-titled album in 2019. Roberts has been nominated, together with his band, for fifteen Juno Awards, winning six, including Artist of the Year twice (2004 and 2009) and Album of the Year once (2004).

Early life and Northstar
Born in Westmount, to South African immigrants who had arrived in Montreal three weeks earlier, Roberts grew up on Cedar Avenue in Pointe-Claire, where his family moved to when he was five years old. Roberts is an alumnus of St. Edmund Elementary School, Beaconsfield, Loyola High School, N.D.G. and John Abbott College, Ste. Anne de Bellevue and McGill University. He holds a BA in English from McGill University, graduating in 1998. Roberts' first band was William in 1993, that changed into Northstar in 1998. As William they put out a single, "Piranha EP" on Northern Assembly Records in 1996, while as Northstar they released a self-titled independent EP in 1998, but broke up in 1999.

As "Sam Roberts" (2002–2010) 
After disbanding Northstar, Roberts recorded a twelve track demo, "Brother Down", which formed the basis for the EP, The Inhuman Condition released in 2002. Recorded with Jordon Zadorozny, Roberts "recorded a song a day". Roberts signed with artist manager Dave Spencer and began to perform live. With the assistance of Linda Bush at Universal Music Publishing Canada, he signed a publishing contract with UMPG and a record contract with MapleMusic Recordings. MapleMusic released the six track EP culled from the demo with Roberts noting that "it is not something I had intended to be my first real foray into the music world but I couldn't turn my back on such a chance". It included two breakthrough singles, "Brother Down" (released in mid-2002) and "Don't Walk Away Eileen" (released in late 2002) which were heavily promoted in the Canadian market.

In August 2002, Roberts signed with Universal Music. In November 2002, Roberts won the CASBY Award for "Favourite New Artist". In 2003, he released his major label debut album, We Were Born in a Flame, with the singles "Where Have All the Good People Gone?" and "Hard Road" garnering success in the Canadian market. The album achieved double platinum sales status in Canada and won two Juno Awards in 2004: Album of the Year and Rock Album of the Year, with Roberts winning the Juno award for Artist of the Year.

Roberts’ second album, Chemical City, was released in April 2006, with the first single "The Gate" topping as a No. 1 hit on Canadian radio. The second single, "Bridge to Nowhere", won the Juno Award for Video of the Year in 2007 and the album achieved platinum sales status.

Roberts' third album, Love at the End of the World, released in May 2008, debuted at No. 1 on the Canadian album chart, a first for Roberts. The lead single, "Them Kids", debuted on iTunes on March 4, 2008. Roberts again won the Juno award for Artist of the Year and the album took home Rock Album of the Year and reached gold sales status.

As Sam Roberts Band (2011–present) 
Roberts released his fourth studio album, Collider, on May 10, 2011. It is the first album under the moniker "Sam Roberts Band" instead of "Sam Roberts". The first single, "I Feel You" was officially released to Canadian radio on February 28, with an iTunes Canada release of March 8.

On November 20, 2013, Roberts announced the release of next album, Lo-Fantasy, which was released by Paper Bag Records on February 11, 2014. Sam Roberts' Band released the Counting the Days EP on April 18, 2015. In 2015, the band collaborated with Toronto's Spearhead Brewery to release the "Sam Roberts Band Session Ale".

Their sixth studio album, Terraform, was released October 28, 2016. On September 12, 2016, a North-American tour was announced to promote their new album. Terraform was later nominated for a 2017 Juno Award for Rock Album of the Year, losing to The Tragically Hip's Man Machine Poem.

The band's seventh studio album, All of Us, was released worldwide on October 16, 2020 on Secret Weapon / Known Accomplice.

Sam Roberts Band members
The members of Sam Roberts Band as of 2020 are:
 Sam Roberts (lead vocals, guitar)
 Dave Nugent (lead guitar)
 Eric Fares (keyboard, guitar)
 James Hall (bass)
 Josh Trager (drums)

Past Members:
 Corey Zadorozny (drums)
 Chet Doxas (tenor saxophone)

Discography

As Sam Roberts 

We Were Born in a Flame (2003)
Chemical City (2006)
Love at the End of the World (2008)

As Sam Roberts Band 

Collider (2011)
Lo-Fantasy (2014)
TerraForm (2016)
All of Us (2020)

With Anyway Gang 
Anyway Gang (2019)

Awards and nominations

Juno Awards
The Juno Awards is a Canadian awards ceremony presented annually by the Canadian Academy of Recording Arts and Sciences.

|-
|rowspan="2"| 2003 ||rowspan="2"| "Brother Down" || Single of the Year || 
|-
| New Artist of the Year || 
|-
|rowspan="3"| 2004 ||rowspan="3"| We Were Born in a Flame || Album of the Year || 
|-
| Rock Album of the Year || 
|-
| Artist of the Year || 
|-
|rowspan="2"| 2007 || "Bridge to Nowhere" || Video of the Year || 
|-
| Chemical City || Rock Album of the Year  || 
|-
|rowspan="3"| 2009 ||rowspan="2"| Love at the End of the World || Artist of the Year || 
|-
| Rock Album of the Year || 
|-
| "Detroit '67" || Video of the Year || 
|-
|rowspan="3"| 2012 ||rowspan="2"| "Them Kids" || Video of the Year || 
|-
| Group of the Year || 
|-
| Collider || Rock Album of the Year || 
|-
| 2017 || TerraForm || Rock Album of the Year || 
|-
| 2021|| All Of Us || Rock Album of the Year ||

MuchMusic Video Awards
The MuchMusic Video Awards was an annual awards ceremony presented by the Canadian music video channel MuchMusic. Roberts has received five awards from fourteen nominations.

|-
|rowspan="4"| 2003 ||rowspan="3"| "Brother Down" || Best VideoFACT || 
|-
| Best Pop Video || 
|-
| Best Independent Video || 
|-
| Sam Roberts || People's Choice – Favourite Canadian Artist || 
|-
|rowspan="6"| 2004 ||rowspan="6"| "Hard Road" || Best Director || 
|-
| Best Cinematography || 
|-
| Best Post-Production || 
|-
| Best Video || 
|-
| Best Pop Video || 
|-
| People's Choice – Favourite Canadian Artist || 
|-
|rowspan="2"| 2006 ||rowspan="2"| "The Gate" || Best MuchMoreMusic Award || 
|-
| People's Choice – Favourite Canadian Artist || 
|-
|rowspan="2"| 2008 ||rowspan="2"| "Them Kids" || Best Director || 
|-
| Best Post-Production ||

Notable performances
July 30, 2003: Opening performer at Molson Canadian Rocks for Toronto, otherwise referred to as SARStock, promoted to mitigate the economic downturn in Toronto following a limited outbreak of severe acute respiratory syndrome (SARS).
June 12, 2003: National Hockey League's (NHL) NHL Awards ceremony main performer
November 16, 2003: Canadian Football League's (CFL) 91st Grey Cup halftime show in Regina, Saskatchewan.
July 2, 2005: Live 8 concert in Barrie, Ontario.
January 1, 2008: AMP Energy NHL Winter Classic, outdoor ice hockey game in Buffalo, New York.
August 2, 2008: Opened for The Eagles in Moncton, New Brunswick
March 29, 2009: Performed at the 2009 Juno Awards
July 18,19 2009: Performed at Folk on the Rocks, in Yellowknife, Northwest Territories.
August 7, 2009: Performed a free concert at Cole Harbour, Nova Scotia, in honour of Sidney Crosby and his Stanley Cup win.
February 20, 2010: Performed at 2010 Olympics in Vancouver.
December 31, 2010: Performed free concert in Brampton, Ontario for New Year's Eve celebrations.
June 25, 2011: Performed at Bobcaygeon Musicfest in Bobcaygeon.
July 1, 2011: Performed a free concert in Ottawa on Canada Day for Prince William, Duke of Cambridge, and his wife Catherine, Duchess of Cambridge.
December 31, 2013: Performed at Niagara Falls' New Year's concert alongside Serena Ryder and Demi Lovato.

See also

Canadian rock
Music of Canada

References

External links
Sam Roberts Band

Sam Roberts Band collection at the Internet Archive's live music archive

1974 births
Anglophone Quebec people
Canadian rock singers
Canadian singer-songwriters
Singers from Montreal
Juno Award for Artist of the Year winners
Living people
McGill University alumni
Canadian people of South African descent
People from Westmount, Quebec
Musicians from Quebec
MapleMusic Recordings artists
Juno Award for Album of the Year winners
Juno Award for Rock Album of the Year winners
21st-century Canadian male singers
Canadian male singer-songwriters